Artediellus atlanticus, the Atlantic hookear sculpin or hookhorn sculpin, is a species of marine ray-finned fish belonging to the family Cottidae. This species is found along the coasts of Northern Atlantic Ocean.

Taxonomy
Artediellus atlanticus Was first formally described in 1898 by the American ichthyologists David Starr Jordan and Barton Warren Evermann with its type locality given as Massachusetts Bay. This species is classified in the genus Artediellus which is classigied in the subfamily Cottinae of the family Cottidae in the 5th edition of Fishes of the World. This speciess is calssified by some authorities in the subgenus Artediellus.

Description
Artediellus atlanticus has an elongated body which is thicker at the front and tapers to the tail with a moderately large mouth. The gill embranes are joined at the isthmus, there are no bony proruberances on the scales of the lateral line and the spine on the operculum is hooked upwards. The dorsal fina are supported by a total of 7 spines and 13 soft rays while the anal fin is supported by 11 soft rays.

Distribution and habitat
Artediellus atlanticus in the North Atlantic Ocean where it occurs from Greenland to Cape Cod in the northwestern Atlantic and from the Barents Sea and Greenland south through Iceland, Scandinavia, the Faroes south to northern Scotland and Ireland.

Biology
Artediellus atlanticus feeds on benthic inverterates such as polychaetes and small molluscs, they very infrequently prey on small crustaceans. The females lay between 50 and 350 eggs in the late summer. The eggs take over 200 days to hatch and the larvae hatched from the eggs are well developed, very similar to adults.

References

Fish described in 1898
atlanticus